"DKR" is a song by Booba released in 2016.

Chart performance

Weekly charts

References

2016 singles
2016 songs
French-language songs
SNEP Top Singles number-one singles